This is a list of charitable projects and non-governmental organizations (NGOs) working in Thailand or connected with Thailand.

Animal welfare 
 Elephant Nature Park
 Soi Dog Foundation
 Wildlife Friends Foundation

Community development

Disabled 
 Adventist Development and Relief Agency (ADRA)
 Caritas International Thailand
 Christian Foundation for the Blind in Thailand
 Christian Care Foundation for Children with Disabilities
 Father Ray Foundation

Education and children

Elderly 
 Adventist Development and Relief Agency (ADRA)

Environment 
 Freeland Foundation
 Green Fins Thailand 
 Norvergence LLC Thailand
 Greenpeace, Southeast Asia, Thailand
 Plant A Tree Today Foundation
 World Wide Fund for Nature
 Scholars of Sustenance Foundation

Hilltribes 
 The Karen Hilltribes Trust

Human rights 
 Amnesty International Thailand
 Children's Organization of Southeast Asia (COSA)
 โครงการรณรงค์เพื่อแรงงานไทย Thai Labour Campaign

Medical

HIV/AIDS 
 มูลนิธิ เอดส์ เฮลท์ แคร์ (AHF) ประเทศไทย
 Baan Gerda home for AIDS orphans in Lopburi
 The Human Development Foundation
Pearl S. Buck International (Thailand)
 Sarnelli House

Women 
 Asia Foundation
 International Rescue Committee
 Pratthanadee Foundation

References

Non-governmental organizations